Taeniesthes is a genus of scarab beetles.

Species
 Taeniesthes collinsi Allard, 1992 - Ethiopia
 Taeniesthes picturata (Harold, 1878)
 Taeniesthes specularis Gerstaecker, 1867 - Kenya and Tanzania

Distribution
This genus is widespread in eastern Africa (Ethiopia, Kenya, Tanzania).

References

Cetoniinae